Natividad Cepeda was born in Tomelloso (Ciudad Real), Spain. She is a Spanish poet, writer and habitual columnist in the Castilla La Mancha press (Lanza, Las Provincias, El periódico común de la Mancha, La tribuna, Pasos, etc. )and in literary magazines (El cardo de bronze, La Alcazaba, etc.) that has been publishing in Spain and Latinoamerica from 1970. Natividad Cepeda's formative influences were Valentin Arteaga, Spanish classic poets and Latino American poets like Pablo Neruda.

References 

 La Revista Prometeo Digital.
 Artistas de Ciudad Real
http://www.hipalage.com Editorial Hipalage.
 Boletín Editorial Hipalage 2008.

External links 
  La bitacora Mientras la Luz
  La bitácora Blogcindario.

1949 births
Living people
Spanish poets
Spanish women poets
Spanish columnists
Spanish women columnists
People from Ciudad Real